Mount Murch is a small mountain in Antarctica, 1,100 m, standing 5 nautical miles (9 km) south of Mount Suydam in Anderson Hills in central Patuxent Range, Pensacola Mountains. It was mapped by the United States Geological Survey (USGS) from surveys and U.S. Navy air photos from 1956 to 1966. It was named by the Advisory Committee on Antarctic Names (US-ACAN) for Paul L. Murch, a cook at Palmer Station during the winter of 1966.

Mountains of Queen Elizabeth Land
Pensacola Mountains